Hirota v. MacArthur, 338 U.S. 197 (1948), was a decision by the Supreme Court of the United States, which held that “the courts of the United States have no power or authority to review, to affirm, set aside or annul the judgments and sentences imposed on these petitioners by the International Military Tribunal for the Far East and for this reason the motions for leave to file petitions for writs of habeas corpus are denied”.

The appeal to the U.S. Supreme Court was made following the death sentence against Kōki Hirota and six other Japanese leaders tried for war crimes.

Legacy
In March 2008, the U.S. government cited Hirota v. MacArthur as "directly applicable" in Munaf v. Geren, 553 U.S. 674 (2008), in which it argued before the Supreme Court that U.S. federal courts lacked jurisdiction over two U.S. citizens being held by the military in Iraq and thus could not review their petitions for habeas corpus.

See also
Rasul v. Bush, 
Hamdi v. Rumsfeld, 
Munaf v. Geren,

References

Further reading
 Aziz Huq, "The Hirota Gambit"  NYU Annual Survey of American Law, 63 (2007) pp. 63-97

External links
 

United States Supreme Court cases
United States Supreme Court cases of the Vinson Court
United States habeas corpus case law
International Military Tribunal for the Far East
1948 in United States case law
Douglas MacArthur